Doncaster was a Parliamentary constituency covering the town of Doncaster in England. It was created in 1885 and abolished in 1983.

Boundaries 
1885–1918: The Municipal Borough of Doncaster, and parts of the Sessional Divisions of Lower Strafforth and Tickhill, and Upper Strafforth and Tickhill.

1918–1950: The Municipal Borough of Doncaster, and the Urban Districts of Adwick-le-Street and Bentley-with-Arksey.

1950–1983: The County Borough of Doncaster.

The area formerly covered by this constituency is now mostly in the Doncaster Central and Doncaster North constituencies.

Members of Parliament

Election results

Elections in the 1970s

Elections in the 1960s

Elections in the 1950s

Elections in the 1940s

In the 1941 Doncaster by-election, Evelyn Walkden was elected unopposed.

Elections in the 1930s

Elections in the 1920s

Elections in the 1910s

Elections in the 1900s

Elections in the 1890s

Elections in the 1880s

References

Sources

Richard Kimber's Political Science Resources (Election results since 1951)

Politics of Doncaster
Parliamentary constituencies in Yorkshire and the Humber (historic)
Constituencies of the Parliament of the United Kingdom established in 1885
Constituencies of the Parliament of the United Kingdom disestablished in 1983